The Stadttheater Meran is the civic theatre of the town of Meran in South Tyrol, northern Italy.

With the economic and financial development of the city as a spa for Empress Elisabeth of Austria and the aristocracy, the need for a higher cultural institution rose. The architect Martin Dülfer, who was a representative of the Munich School of Architecture, was given the commission to build the new theatre. He designed the theatre in the Jugendstil. It was completed in 1899 and inaugurated on December 1, 1900.

After the annexation of the town following the end of World War I from Austria-Hungary to Italy was the theatre renamed by the Italians after Giacomo Puccini, who visited the town in 1923. The theatre saw its decline after World War II and the 1950s. It was, however, revived again and renovated after a fire in 1978.

References

Further reading 
 Dieter Klein, Martin Dülfers Meraner Stadttheater, in «Südtirol in Wort und Bild», 26–27, 1982–83, pp. 6–2.
 Renate Abram, Das Meraner Stadttheater, Lana, Fotolitho, 1989.
 Renate Abram, 100 Jahre Stadttheater Meran 1900-2000. Festschrift, Merano, Meraner Stadttheater- und Kurhausverein, 2000.
 Arrigo Valesio, Catalogo delle stagioni liriche al teatro civico di Merano dal 1900 al 1971 / Auflistung der musikalischen Darbietungen im Meraner Stadttheater von 1900 bis 1971, Merano, 2001.

External links 

 Meraner Stadttheater und Kurhausverein | Stadttheater Meran (with interior images)

Merano
Theatres in Italy
Art Nouveau architecture in Italy
Buildings and structures in South Tyrol
Tourist attractions in South Tyrol
Art Nouveau theatres
Theatres completed in 1899
1899 establishments in Austria-Hungary
19th-century architecture in Italy